Giorgio Cattaneo (21 February 1923 – 17 February 1998) was an Italian speed skater. He competed in two events at the 1948 Winter Olympics.

References

External links
 

1923 births
1998 deaths
Italian male speed skaters
Olympic speed skaters of Italy
Speed skaters at the 1948 Winter Olympics